Magnapinna pacifica is a species of bigfin squid known only from three immature specimens; two caught at a depth of less than 300 m and one from a fish stomach. M. pacifica is the type species of the genus Magnapinna. It is characterised primarily by its proximal tentacles, which are wider than adjacent arms and bear numerous suckers.

M. pacifica was described in 1998 by Michael Vecchione and Richard E. Young based on three specimens. The paratype (USNM 885787), a juvenile specimen of  ML, was found in the stomach of a lancetfish (Alepisaurus ferox). It had initially dried out and was later reconstituted.

References

Bibliography
Vecchione, M. & Young, R. E. (1998). "The Magnapinnidae, a newly discovered family of oceanic squids (Cephalopoda; Oegopsida)". South African Journal of Marine Science 20: 429-437.

External links
Tree of Life web project: Magnapinna pacifica

Squid
Cephalopods of Oceania
Cephalopods of North America
Fauna of California
Molluscs described in 1998